Evans House is a historic home located at Salem, Virginia. It was built in 1882, and is a -story, "L"-shaped, French Empire style brick dwelling. It features two concavely cut intersecting mansard roofs which are pierced by two paneled interior chimneys with corbeled caps.  The front facade is symmetrically divided by a two-story projecting central pavilion supported by a bracketed cornice and topped with a convexly rendered mansard roof.

It was added to the National Register of Historic Places in 1972.

References

External links
Evans-Webber House, 213 North Broad Street, Salem, Salem, VA: 1 photo and 1 photo caption page at Historic American Buildings Survey

Historic American Buildings Survey in Virginia
Houses on the National Register of Historic Places in Virginia
Second Empire architecture in Virginia
Houses completed in 1882
Houses in Salem, Virginia
National Register of Historic Places in Salem, Virginia